The golden-bellied flyrobin (Microeca hemixantha) is a species of bird in the family Petroicidae.
It is native to the Tanimbar Islands.

Its natural habitats are subtropical or tropical moist lowland forest and subtropical or tropical mangrove forest.
It is threatened by habitat loss.

References

golden-bellied flyrobin
Birds of the Tanimbar Islands
golden-bellied flyrobin
golden-bellied flyrobin
Taxonomy articles created by Polbot